The Conference of Independent Schools of Ontario Athletic Association, or CISAA, is a sports conference for various private schools located primarily in the southern part of the province of Ontario. Many of the institutions are located in or near the Greater Toronto Area; One member school, Nichols School, is located in Buffalo, New York.

The CISAA grew out of the Little Big Four conference, consisting of Upper Canada College, Toronto; St. Andrew's College, Aurora; Ridley College, St. Catharines; and Trinity College School (TCS), Port Hope; four of the oldest private schools in Canada. Teams for the 37 schools currently in the CISAA regularly compete in numerous sports against public high schools in the Ontario Federation of Schools Athletic Association (OFSAA) provincial championships.

Member schools
 Albert College
 Appleby College
 Bayview Glen School
 Bethany Hills School (closed)
 Bishop Strachan School
 Branksome Hall
 The Country Day School
 Crescent School (Toronto)
 Crestwood Preparatory College
 De La Salle College (Toronto)
 Greenwood College School
 Grey Gables School
 Havergal College
 Hawthorn School for Girls
 Hillfield Strathallan College
 Holy Trinity School
 Kempenfelt Bay School
 Kingsway College School
 Lakefield College School
 The Linden School
 Montcrest School
 Nichols School
 Pickering College
 Ridley College
 Rosseau Lake College
 Royal St. George's College
 St. Andrew's College
 St. Clement's School
 St. John's Kilmarnock
 St. Michael's College School
St. Mildred's-Lightbourn School
 St. Thomas of Villanova College
 Sterling Hall School
 Toronto French School
 Toronto Montessori Schools
 Trafalgar Castle School
 Trinity College School
 Upper Canada College
 The York School

External links
CISAA Web Site

Sports governing bodies in Ontario